Maggodee Creek is a creek in Franklin County in the United States state of Virginia. The creek is a southeast-flowing tributary of the Blackwater River, part of the Roanoke River watershed.

The creek is located in the Blue Ridge, Piedmont, and Appalachian mountains. The town of Boones Mill, Virginia is located in the valley of the creek. Historically, alternate names for this stream have included "Maggodi Creek" and "Maggotty Creek."

The Piedmont Mill Historic District, is located along the creek. The water-powered Martin-Piedmont-Clements mill (built in the 1860s) was built on Maggodee Creek, which helped the rural industry to flourish in Southside Virginia. In 1929, the Virginia State Highway Commission built a single lane truss bridge over the creek.

See also 

 List of rivers of Virginia

References 

Rivers of Virginia
Tributaries of the Roanoke River

Roanoke River